The Gauss–Newton algorithm is used to solve non-linear least squares problems, which is equivalent to minimizing a sum of squared function values. It is an extension of Newton's method for finding a minimum of a non-linear function. Since a sum of squares must be nonnegative, the algorithm can be viewed as using Newton's method to iteratively approximate zeroes of the components of the sum, and thus minimizing the sum. In this sense, the algorithm is also an effective method for solving overdetermined systems of equations. It has the advantage that second derivatives, which can be challenging to compute, are not required.

Non-linear least squares problems arise, for instance, in non-linear regression, where parameters in a model are sought such that the model is in good agreement with available observations.

The method is named after the mathematicians Carl Friedrich Gauss and Isaac Newton, and first appeared in Gauss' 1809 work Theoria motus corporum coelestium in sectionibus conicis solem ambientum.

Description 
Given  functions  (often called residuals) of  variables  with  the Gauss–Newton algorithm iteratively finds the value of the variables that minimize the sum of squares

Starting with an initial guess  for the minimum, the method proceeds by the iterations

where, if r and β are column vectors, the entries of the Jacobian matrix are

and the symbol  denotes the matrix transpose.

At each iteration, the update  can be found by rearranging the previous equation in the following two steps:

 

If , the iteration simplifies to

which is a direct generalization of Newton's method in one dimension.

In data fitting, where the goal is to find the parameters  such that a given model function  best fits some data points , the functions are the residuals:

Then, the Gauss–Newton method can be expressed in terms of the Jacobian  of the function  as

Notes

The assumption  in the algorithm statement is necessary, as otherwise the matrix  is not invertible and the normal equations cannot be solved (at least uniquely).

The Gauss–Newton algorithm can be derived by linearly approximating the vector of functions ri. Using Taylor's theorem, we can write at every iteration:

The task of finding  minimizing the sum of squares of the right-hand side; i.e.,

is a linear least-squares problem, which can be solved explicitly, yielding the normal equations in the algorithm.

The normal equations are n simultaneous linear equations in the unknown increments . For large systems, an iterative method, such as the conjugate gradient method, may be more efficient. If there is a linear dependence between columns of Jr, the iterations will fail, as   becomes singular.

When  is complex  the conjugate form should be used: .

Example

In this example, the Gauss–Newton algorithm will be used to fit a model to some data by minimizing the sum of squares of errors between the data and model's predictions.

In a biology experiment studying the relation between substrate concentration  and reaction rate in an enzyme-mediated reaction, the data in the following table were obtained. 

It is desired to find a curve (model function) of the form

We will find  and  such that the sum of squares of the residuals

is minimized.

The Jacobian  of the vector of residuals  with respect to the unknowns  is a  matrix with the -th row having the entries

The sum of squares of residuals decreased from the initial value of 1.445 to 0.00784 after the fifth iteration. The plot in the figure on the right shows the curve determined by the model for the optimal parameters with the observed data.

Convergence properties

The Gauss-Newton iteration is guaranteed to converge toward a local minimum point  under 4 conditions: The functions  are twice continuously differentiable in an open convex set , the Jacobian  is of full column rank, the initial iterate  is near , and the local minimum value  is small.  The convergence is quadratic if .

For large minimum value , however, convergence is not guaranteed, not even local convergence as in Newton's method, or convergence under the usual Wolfe conditions.

The rate of convergence of the Gauss–Newton algorithm can approach quadratic. The algorithm may converge slowly or not at all if the initial guess is far from the minimum or the matrix  is ill-conditioned.  For example, consider the problem with  equations and  variable, given by

If , then the problem is in fact linear and the method finds the optimum in one iteration. If |λ| < 1, then the method converges linearly and the error decreases asymptotically with a factor |λ| at every iteration. However, if |λ| > 1, then the method does not even converge locally.

Solving overdetermined systems of equations

The Gauss-Newton iteration

It can be considered an extension of Newton's method and enjoys the same local quadratic convergence  toward isolated regular solutions. 

The point  is often called a least squares solution of the overdetermined system.

Derivation from Newton's method 

In what follows, the Gauss–Newton algorithm will be derived from Newton's method for function optimization via an approximation. As a consequence, the rate of convergence of the Gauss–Newton algorithm can be quadratic under certain regularity conditions. In general (under weaker conditions), the convergence rate is linear.

The recurrence relation for Newton's method for minimizing a function S of parameters  is

where g denotes the gradient vector of S, and H denotes the Hessian matrix of S.

Since , the gradient is given by

Elements of the Hessian are calculated by differentiating the gradient elements, with respect to :

The Gauss–Newton method is obtained by ignoring the second-order derivative terms (the second term in this expression). That is, the Hessian is approximated by

where  are entries of the Jacobian Jr. Note that when the exact hessian is evaluated near an exact fit we have near-zero , so the second term becomes near-zero as well, which justifies the approximation. The gradient and the approximate Hessian can be written in matrix notation as

These expressions are substituted into the recurrence relation above to obtain the operational equations

Convergence of the Gauss–Newton method is not guaranteed in all instances. The approximation

that needs to hold to be able to ignore the second-order derivative terms may be valid in two cases, for which convergence is to be expected:
 The function values  are small in magnitude, at least around the minimum. 
 The functions are only "mildly" nonlinear, so that  is relatively small in magnitude.

Improved versions 

With the Gauss–Newton method the sum of squares of the residuals S may not decrease at every iteration. However, since Δ is a descent direction, unless  is a stationary point, it holds that  for all sufficiently small . Thus, if divergence occurs, one solution is to employ a fraction  of the increment vector Δ in the updating formula:

Typically,  should be chosen such that it satisfies the Wolfe conditions or the Goldstein conditions.

In cases where the direction of the shift vector is such that the optimal fraction α is close to zero, an alternative method for handling divergence is the use of the Levenberg–Marquardt algorithm, a trust region method. The normal equations are modified in such a way that the increment vector is rotated towards the direction of steepest descent,

where D is a positive diagonal matrix.

The so-called Marquardt parameter  may also be optimized by a line search, but this is inefficient, as the shift vector must be recalculated every time  is changed. A more efficient strategy is this: When divergence occurs, increase the Marquardt parameter until there is a decrease in S. Then retain the value from one iteration to the next, but decrease it if possible until a cut-off value is reached, when the Marquardt parameter can be set to zero; the minimization of S then becomes a standard Gauss–Newton minimization.

Large-scale optimization

For large-scale optimization, the Gauss–Newton method is of special interest because it is often (though certainly not always) true that the matrix  is more sparse than the approximate Hessian . In such cases, the step calculation itself will typically need to be done with an approximate iterative method appropriate for large and sparse problems, such as the conjugate gradient method.

In order to make this kind of approach work, one needs at least an efficient method for computing the product

for some vector p. However, if one defines ci as row i of the matrix , the following simple relation holds:

so that every row contributes additively and independently to the product. In addition to respecting a practical sparse storage structure, this expression is well suited for parallel computations. Note that every row ci is the gradient of the corresponding residual ri; with this in mind, the formula above emphasizes the fact that residuals contribute to the problem independently of each other.

Related algorithms 

In a quasi-Newton method, such as that due to Davidon, Fletcher and Powell or Broyden–Fletcher–Goldfarb–Shanno (BFGS method) an estimate of the full Hessian  is built up numerically using first derivatives  only so that after n refinement cycles the method closely approximates to Newton's method in performance. Note that quasi-Newton methods can minimize general real-valued functions, whereas Gauss–Newton, Levenberg–Marquardt, etc. fits only to nonlinear least-squares problems.

Another method for solving minimization problems using only first derivatives is gradient descent. However, this method does not take into account the second derivatives even approximately. Consequently, it is highly inefficient for many functions, especially if the parameters have strong interactions.

Notes

References

 .

External links 
 Probability, Statistics and Estimation  The algorithm is detailed and applied to the biology experiment discussed as an example in this article (page 84 with the uncertainties on the estimated values).

Implementations 
Artelys Knitro is a non-linear solver with an implementation of the Gauss–Newton method. It is written in C and has interfaces to C++/C#/Java/Python/MATLAB/R.

Optimization algorithms and methods
Least squares
Statistical algorithms